Dasburg is a municipality in the district of Bitburg-Prüm, in Rhineland-Palatinate, western Germany. Before the French Revolutionary Wars it was a part of the Duchy of Luxemburg.

References

Bitburg-Prüm